Mohammed Kamin (born 1978) is a citizen of Afghanistan who was held in the United States Guantanamo Bay detention camps, in Cuba.  The Joint Task Force Guantanamo estimate that Kamin was born in 1978.  He was transferred to the United Arab Emirates on August 13, 2016.

Charges before a Guantanamo Military Commission

On March 11, 2008, the Office of Military Commissions announced that Mohammed Kamin would face charges. On March 12, 2008, Kamin was charged with a single count of "providing material support to terrorism."  This charge made Kamin unique among the other prisoners at Guantanamo Bay because it alone is not a war crime, and thus is probably not triable before a military commission.

On May 21, he refused to exit his cell to attend his arraignment. He was physically manacled and dragged into court nonetheless, where he stated that he had no connection to al-Qaeda or the Taliban.  Kamin continued to refuse to attend his trial as late as June 2008.

On July 15, 2009, military prosecutors asked the commission to allow them to continue their case against Kamin until September 2009.  The commission granted this request.   Kamin continued to boycott proceedings against him, including a pre-trial hearing in November 2009.   All charges were withdrawn and dismissed on December 8, 2009.  Had he been convicted he could have faced life in prison.

Transfer to the United Arab Emirates

Kamin was transferred to the United Arab Emirates with fourteen other individuals, including Obaidullah.  Twelve of the men were Yemenis.

See also
 Boycott of Guantanamo Military Commissions

References

External links

 Who Are the Remaining Prisoners in Guantánamo? Part Eight: Captured in Afghanistan (2002-07) Andy Worthington
 Human Rights First blog: Military Commissions
Human Rights First; The Case of Mohammed Kamin

Living people
Afghan extrajudicial prisoners of the United States
Detainees of the Guantanamo Bay detention camp
1978 births
Year of birth uncertain